Moderate Tropical Storm Dumako was a weak tropical cyclone that caused moderate damage in Madagascar. The fourth disturbance and fourth named storm of the 2021–22 South-West Indian Ocean cyclone season, it was the third storm to make landfall on Madagascar in 2022 after Ana and Batsirai.

Meteorological history

On 10 February, a zone of disturbed weather formed over the central South Indian Ocean. One day later, the JTWC recognized it as Invest 94S. On the same day at 18:00 UTC, MFR designated the system as a tropical disturbance. A day later, the MFR upgraded the disturbance to a tropical depression. The JTWC issued a Tropical Cyclone Formation Alert for this system. On 13 February, the JTWC recognized the system as Tropical Cyclone 12S at 06:00 UTC. At 18:00 UTC, the MFR upgraded the system to a moderate tropical storm and designated it as Dumako. The storm continued intensifying, and at 06:00 UTC on February 14, Dumako reached its peak intensity as a moderate tropical storm, with maximum 10-minute sustained winds of 85 km/h (50 mph), maximum 1-minute sustained winds of 95 km/h (60 mph), and a minimum central pressure of 993 hPa.
Around 12:00 UTC, Dumako made landfall as a moderate tropical storm near Sainte-Marie Island, Madagascar with winds of 65 km/h (40 mph). Afterward, due to land interaction, the storm began to weaken. After a few hours, it weakened into a tropical depression. It entered the Mozambique Channel before dissipating on 18 February.

Impact

Madagascar
At least 113 houses were damaged, more than 5000 people were affected. Flooding killed at least 14 people in Madagascar and 4,323 people were displaced.

Mozambique and Malawi
Heavy rain was recorded in South Malawi and caused flooding in some areas. No deaths were reported in Mozambique and Malawi.

See also
Weather of 2022
Tropical cyclones in 2022
Cyclone Emnati – Struck Madagascar around a week later.

References

External links
MFR Track Data of Moderate Tropical Storm Dumako
JTWC best track data of Tropical Cyclone Dumako 

D
D